The Blue Hawaiians are a surf rock group from Los Angeles. They formed in 1994 to play at the opening of their friend Michelle's club, The Lava Lounge. They rose to fame soon thereafter due to the rise of one of their earliest fans, Quentin Tarantino, and appearances on the soundtrack of the television series Friends and the 1996 film Sex. The group have since released several albums which have generally fared well with critics. The band also did music for the cartoon series SpongeBob SquarePants, and their song "A Cheat" was featured in an advertisement for Guess Jeans. Current band members include Mark Fontana, Erik Godal, Mark Sproull, Maxwellvision, and Gary Brandin. The band are in a self-described “semi-hiatus” but continue to play infrequent live shows, including appearances at the annual Tiki Oasis music festival.

Discography

Albums 

 Christmas on Big Island (October 24, 1995)
 Live at the Lava Lounge (August 4, 1997)
 Sway (March 4, 1998)
 Savage Night (July 13, 1999)
 Live at the Lava Lounge 2 (November 15, 2005)

Singles 

 "Glimpse of Savage Night" (January 26, 1999)

Tracks they composed for shows

SpongeBob SquarePants 

 "Hawaii Bob"
 "War Blowers"
 "02 SpongeBob 2"
 "Hawaiian Walk"

External links
 Artist Home Page on Pascal Records
 Artist MySpace Page
 Biography & Discography (in French)
 Reverb Central includes reviews of all five Blue Hawaiians albums

Surf music groups
Rock music groups from California
Musical groups established in 1994
1994 establishments in California